Vai or VAI has several possible meanings:
 Vai people
 Vai language
 Vai syllabary
 Vai (Unicode block)
 Vai (Crete)
 Văi, a village in Lupșa Commune, Alba County, Romania

Abbreviation 
 Van Andel Institute, a biomedical research and science education organization in the United States
 VAI, Video Artists International, a classical music record label
 Voest-Alpine Industrieanlagenbau, later part of Siemens VAI Metals Technologies

People 
 Rosita Vai (born 1981), New Zealand singer
 Steve Vai (born 1960), guitarist
 Steve Vai's band Vai
 Vai Sikahema (born 1962), American football player
 Vai Taua (born 1988), American football player
 Vai Toutai (born 1993), Australian Rugby League player
 Vaï (born 1979), Moroccan-French Canadian rapper

Language and nationality disambiguation pages